Heinz Leymann (17 July 1932 – 26 January 1999)  was a Swedish academic, famous for his studies on mobbing among humans. He held a degree in pedagogical psychology, and another one in psychiatry and worked as a psychologist. He was a professor at Umeå University.

Academic background 
Born in 1932 in Wolfenbüttel, Germany, Leymann, became a Swedish citizen in the mid-1950s, and was awarded his PhD in pedagogical psychology from Stockholm University in 1978. He then went on to get another research doctorate (doktor i medicinsk vetenskap, "doctor of medical science," typically translated into English as PhD) in psychiatry in 1990 from Umeå University. Somewhat unusually, his doctorate in psychiatry was based on his clinical background as a psychologist; he did not go through medical training.

Leymann's work on mobbing 
Leymann pioneered research into mobbing in the 1980s. His initial research in the area was based on detailed case studies of a number of nurses who had committed or tried to commit suicide due to events at the workplace. He developed the Leymann Inventory of Psychological Terror (LIPT), a questionnaire of 45 mobbing actions.

Although he preferred the term bullying in the context of school children, some have come to regard mobbing as a form of group bullying. As professor and practicing psychologist, Leymann also noted one of the side-effects of mobbing is post-traumatic stress disorder and is frequently misdiagnosed.

Among researchers who have built on Leymann's work are: 
 Davenport, Schwartz & Elliott
 Hecker
 Shallcross, Ramsay & Barker
 Westhues
 Zapf & Einarsen

See also 
 Leymann Inventory of Psychological Terror
 Workplace bullying

References 

Duffy, M., & Sperry, L. (2012). Mobbing:  Causes, Consequences, and Solutions. New York:  Oxford University Press.

External links 
 The Mobbing Encyclopaedia Website concerning Leymann's work on mobbing.
 The Heinz Leymann Memorial Website Website dedicated to the research of Dr. Heinz Leymann.

Academics and writers on bullying
Workplace bullying
1932 births
1999 deaths
Swedish psychologists
Swedish psychiatrists
Swedish people of German descent
Stockholm University alumni
Umeå University alumni
Academic staff of Umeå University
20th-century psychologists